Sunil Shastri (born 13 February 1950) is an Indian politician and a former cabinet minister in the Government of Uttar Pradesh. He is the son of Lal Bahadur Shastri, the second Prime Minister of India. Before joining politics, he served the Bank of India as an Officer in different capacities for fourteen years. He was also elected to Uttar Pradesh Legislative Assembly from Gorakhpur Urban assembly constituency as INC candidate.  His son Vinamra Shastri is a corporate leader and writes about politics. He fought against V. P. Singh from Allahabad Lok Sabha seat on Congress party ticket, but lost. 

Sunil Shastri started his career with Congress Party, but joined Bharatiya Janata Party in 2009.  He re-joined Indian National Congress in December 2021.

References

Living people
1950 births
Indian National Congress politicians from Uttar Pradesh
Bharatiya Janata Party politicians from Uttar Pradesh
Politicians from Lucknow
Children of prime ministers of India
Uttar Pradesh MLAs 1980–1985
Uttar Pradesh MLAs 1985–1989